The Panzergranate 39 or Pzgr. 39 was a German armor-piercing shell used during World War II. It was manufactured in various calibers and was the most common anti-tank shell used in German tank (German: Kampfwagenkanone; shorted to KwK) and anti-tank guns (German: Panzerabwehrkanone(n); shortened to PaK) of  caliber.

Design 

The Pzgr. 39 was an APCBC-HE-T design. It consisted of the shell body that was armour penetrating (AP) using a cap (C) to increase performance against sloped armour, a ballistic cap (BC) to increase aerodynamic performance along with a high explosive (HE) filler and tracer unit (T) that was incorporated into the base fuze. Phlegmatized PETN or RDX were commonplace as the explosive filling. Pzgr. 39 was only used in guns firing fixed ammunition. The same Pzgr. 39 shells of a certain caliber could be fitted to different cartridge cases. For example, the 7.5 cm Pak 40 L/46 antitank gun and the 7.5 cm KwK 40 L/48 tank gun fired the same projectile, even though they had completely different cartridge cases.

Different versions of the shell were made, but the changes were usually minor. For instance, in the 88 mm Pzgr. 39-1 version the quality of steel was improved. The 75 mm Pzgr. 39/42 of KwK 42 and Pak 42 guns had two driving bands instead of one. In the Pzgr. 39/43 of KwK and Pak 43 guns, the driving bands were made wider than those of Pzgr. 39-1. The widening took place because the high gas pressure in these long-barreled guns presented certain problems when firing the older Pzgr. 39–1 shells with narrower driving bands. The abbreviation 'FES', found on many Pzgr. 39 rounds indicates the presence of sintered iron driving bands.

Technical data - 75 mm Pzgr. 39 FES 

 Weight, complete with fuze: 
 Explosive filler:  of RDX and wax (90/10)
 Number of driving bands: 1
 Material of driving band: sintered iron
 Shell diameter at driving band: 
 Shell body diameter: 
 Fuze: Bd.Z. 5103
 Type: base fuze
 Weight with tracer unit: 
 Tracer burning time: 2 seconds

References 

 Walter E. Wagenknecht: Die Fertigung von Panzergeschossen, In: Deutsches Waffen Journal, Nr. 5–6, 1977.
 D 460/1+ Geschoßringbuch, Band I, Juli 1939.
 D 460/10+ Ringbuch für Sprengladungen, Band I, 26. Oktober 1942.
 L.Dv. 4402/8 Munition der 8,8 cm Flak 41 (Munition der Flakartillerie Teil 8) Mai 1943.
 D 435/1, Handbuch, Munition der deutschen Geschütze und Werfer, 28. Dezember 1940.

External links 

 

Artillery shells
Anti-tank rounds
World War II weapons of Germany